Operation Duryodhana (2005) was the code name of a sting operation, which captured on camera eleven members of Parliament of India accepting money to table questions on the floor of the Parliament.

Description
This was the first such sting operation in the history of Republic of India, and all the members were expelled from the Parliament.
Ten of them belonged to 14th Lok Sabha while one was from Rajya Sabha.

The operation was named after the Mahabharata character Duryodhana who is popularly viewed as evil and power-hungry.

The eleven members involved were:
 
 Narendra Kushwaha (BSP) - Mirzapur, Uttar Pradesh: Rs 55,000
 Annasaheb M. K. Patil (BJP) - Erandol, Maharashtra: Rs 45,000
 Chhatrapal Singh Lodha (BJP) - Odisha (Rajya Sabha) : Rs 15,000
 Y. G. Mahajan (BJP) - Jalgaon, Maharashtra: Rs 35,000
 Manoj Kumar (Rashtriya Janata Dal) - Palamau, Jharkhand: Rs 110,000
 Suresh Chandel (BJP) - Hamirpur, Himachal Pradesh: Rs 30,000
 Raja Ram Pal (BSP) - Bilhaur, Uttar Pradesh : Rs 35,000
 Lal Chandra Kol (BSP) - Robertsganj, Uttar Pradesh: Rs 35,000
 Pradeep Gandhi (BJP) - Rajnandgaon, Chhattisgarh: Rs 55,000
 Chandra Pratap Singh (BJP) - Sidhi, Madhya Pradesh : Rs 35,000
 Ramsevak Singh (Congress) - Gwalior, Madhya Pradesh: Rs 50,000

The party-wise breakup is: 
 Bharatiya Janata Party: 6
 Bahujan Samaj Party: 3
 Indian National Congress: 1
 Rashtriya Janata Dal: 1

The party breakup is a result of the access the journalists had to
different politicians (many of the BJP leads were connected to their original
contacts).

Conversion rates: approx. Rs. 45 was one US Dollar towards the end of 2005.

14th Lok Sabha
2005 in India
Political corruption in India
Investigative journalism